Hayden James Carter (born 17 December 1999) is an English professional footballer who plays as a defender for Blackburn Rovers.

Career
Born in Stockport, Carter played youth football with Manchester City before switching to Blackburn Rovers in 2014.

On 9 June 2020, Carter agreed a new two-year-deal with Blackburn. Carter made his professional debut for Blackburn in the club's EFL Championship fixture against Reading on 18 July, playing the full 90-minutes in the 4-3 win.

On 6 January 2021, Carter joined League One side Burton Albion on loan until the end of the season. He made 24 league appearances for Burton, scoring four goals for the side. Carter was rewarded for his performances as he received the player of the season runner up award at Burtons end of season awards.

On 15 January 2022, Carter joined EFL League One side Portsmouth on loan for the remainder of the 2021–22 season. He made 22 league appearances for Portsmouth, scoring one goal for the side. His sole strike for the club vs Oxford was voted goal of the season at Portsmouths end of season awards.

Career statistics

References

External links 

Blackburn Rovers profile

1999 births
Living people
Association football defenders
Footballers from Stockport
English footballers
Blackburn Rovers F.C. players
Burton Albion F.C. players
Portsmouth F.C. players
English Football League players